The Holloway brooch was presented by the Women's Social and Political Union (WPSU) to women who had been imprisoned at Holloway Prison for militant suffragette activity. It is also referred to as the "Portcullis badge", the "Holloway Prison brooch" and the "Victoria Cross of the Union".

Background

Beginning in 1902 Holloway Prison was a female-only prison in London, England. In the early part of the twentieth century many suffragettes were incarcerated at the prison. As their actions became more militant the women received more severe sentences. Once in prison the women continued their protests, eventually going on hunger strikes as they demanded to be designated as "political prisoners".

Holloway brooch
The Holloway brooch was designed by Sylvia Pankhurst. Made of silver, it depicts the portcullis symbol of Parliament and a broad arrow, associated with prison uniforms, in purple, white, and green enamel. The brooches were given to suffragettes upon their release from Holloway. It was manufactured by Toye & Co London.

On 29 April 1909 the first brooches were distributed at a large meeting at the Albert Hall organised by the WSPU. The first brooches were presented by Christabel Pankhurst and Emmeline Pankhurst, Annie Kenney and Emmeline Pethick-Lawrence.

Recipients 

• Lady Constance Bulwer-Lytton
Dora Beedham
Sarah Benett
Violet Ann Bland
Mabel Capper
Joan Cather
Leonora Cohen
Louie (Louisa) Cullen
Emily Davison
Kate Williams Evans
Theresa Garnett
Clara Giveen
Katie Edith Gliddon
Laura Geraldine Lennox
Anna Lewis
Selina Martin
Edith Bessie New
Annie Seymour Pearson
Pleasance Pendred
Grace Roe
Amy Sanderson
Janie Terrero
Minnie Turner
Julia Varley

See also
 Emmeline and Christabel Pankhurst Memorial
 Hunger Strike Medal
 Suffrage jewellery
 The Suffragette Handkerchief

References

Brooches
Feminism and the arts
Women's Social and Political Union
Penal system in England
1909 establishments in England
Imprisonment and detention of women
Awards established in 1909
English awards